Flesh and Blood is the fifth full-length album by hardcore punk band No Innocent Victim. It was released in 1999 on Victory Records.

Track listing 
"Flesh and Blood" – 2:28
"C.E.B." – 2:14
"My Beliefs" – 1:54
"Answer to No One" – 1:33
"Never Face Defeat" – 2:18
"All for the Color" – 1:37
"Whitewashed Tomb" – 1:43
"Till the End" – 2:40
"As I Fight" – 1:57
"Tear Us Apart" – 1:57 (feat. Bruce Fitzhugh of Living Sacrifice)
"Pushed Aside" – 1:48
"Death Grip" – 2:36

1999 albums
No Innocent Victim albums